The Canton of La Guerche-sur-l'Aubois is a canton situated in the Cher département and in the Centre-Val de Loire region of France.

Geography 
An area of forestry and farming in the valley of the Aubois river, in the northeastern part of the arrondissement of Saint-Amand-Montrond centred on the town of La Guerche-sur-l'Aubois.

Composition 
At the French canton reorganisation which came into effect in March 2015, the canton was expanded from 9 to 22 communes:
 
Apremont-sur-Allier
Blet
La Chapelle-Hugon
Charly
Le Chautay
Cornusse
Cours-les-Barres
Croisy
Cuffy
Flavigny
Germigny-l'Exempt
La Guerche-sur-l'Aubois
Ignol
Jouet-sur-l'Aubois
Lugny-Bourbonnais
Menetou-Couture
Mornay-Berry
Nérondes
Ourouer-les-Bourdelins
Saint-Hilaire-de-Gondilly
Tendron
Torteron

Population

See also 
 Arrondissements of the Cher department
 Cantons of the Cher department
 Communes of the Cher department

References

Guerche-sur-l'Aubois